The South Winneshiek Community School District (SW) is a rural public school district headquartered in Calmar, Iowa. With campuses in Calmar and Ossian, it serves grades Pre-K through 12th.

The district is entirely in Winneshiek County, and includes the municipalities of Calmar, Ossian, Castalia, and Spillville. It also includes the unincorporated areas of Conover and Festina.

The school mascot is the Warriors, and the colors are dark red and white.

Schools
South Winneshiek High School serves grades 9–12. The school is located in Calmar.

South Winneshiek Elementary/Middle School serves grades PreK-8. The school is located in Ossian.

South Winneshiek High School

Athletics
The Warriors compete in the Upper Iowa Conference in the following sports:

Cross Country
 Boys (2006, 2008)
Girls (2021)
Volleyball
Football
Basketball
Wrestling
Track and Field 
 Girls' 2-time State Champions (1997, 1999)
Golf 
Baseball
Softball

See also
List of school districts in Iowa
List of high schools in Iowa

References

External links
 South Winneshiek Community School District
 

School districts in Iowa
Education in Winneshiek County, Iowa
School districts established in 1958
1958 establishments in Iowa